is a town located in Nagaoka District, Kōchi Prefecture, Japan. Motoyama has been named one of The Most Beautiful Villages in Japan.

Geography
Motoyama is located in the Shikoku Mountains near the center of northern Kōchi Prefecture. The upper reaches of the Yoshino River and Shikoku's largest dam, the Sameura Dam are located in the town.

Neighbouring municipalities 
Kōchi Prefecture
Nankoku
Kami
 Ōtoyo
Tosa
Ehime Prefecture
Shikokuchūō

Climate
Motoyama has a humid subtropical climate (Köppen climate classification Cfa) with hot, humid summers and cool winters. There is significant precipitation throughout the year, especially during June and July.

Population and Demographics 
The population in Motoyama was 7,343 in 1965, but as of May 2017 it has gone down to 3‚605 and continues to decrease.

According to the 2005 census:  the population of people 15 years old and under is 417, the population of those 65 years and over is 1,657 and the percentage of seniors in Motoyama is 38% compared to the prefectural average of 26%.  There are 1,835 households with on average 2.32 people per household.  The number of people per household continues to decrease as households with seniors continue to increase.  It is assumed that this trend will continue for the foreseen future.

History 
As with all of Kōchi Prefecture, the area of Motoyama was part of ancient Tosa Province. During the Edo period, the area was part of the holdings of Tosa Domain ruled by the Yamauchi clan from their seat at Kōchi Castle. The village of Nishi-Motoyama was established with the creation of the modern municipalities system on October 1, 1889 our of 12 smaller hamlets. It was renamed Motoyama Village on June1, 1890. Motoyama was raised to town status on June 1, 1910. On April 20, 1955, Motomachi merged with the neighboring town of Yoshino. However, on April 1, 1961, five western hamlets of Motomachi were transferred to the neighboring town of Tosa.

Government
Motoyama has a mayor-council form of government with a directly elected mayor and a unicameral town council of ten members. Motoyama, together with the other municipalities of Tosa District and Nagaoka District, contributes one member to the Kōchi Prefectural Assembly. In terms of national politics, the village is part of Kōchi 1st district of the lower house of the Diet of Japan.

Economy
The economy of Motoyama is based forestry, agriculture and the raising of Japanese Brown beef cattle.

Education
Motomachi has two public elementary schools and one public middle school operated by the town government, and one public high school operated by the Kochi Prefectural Board of Education

Transportation

Railway
Motoyama has no passenger railway service. The nearest station is Ōsugi Station on the JR Shikoku Dosan Line; however, most passengers travel to Kōchi Station by bus.

Highways

Sister city relations
 - Upper Darby Township, Delaware County, Pennsylvania, United States,  friendship city since August 10, 1966

Local attractions

Events 
Flower Festival (Hana-matsuri) March 25 – May 6
A festival which welcomes the coming of spring along with the blooming of various flowers.  Cherry blossoms and Tsutsuji (azalea) can be seen in the central area of Motoyama, while the highlight of the festival can be seen at the nearby Kizenzan Park (帰全山公園) where over 30,000 Shakunage (rhododendron) are displayed.

Asemi River Marathon late July
An annual marathon first held in 1986, where roughly 500 participants run along the Asemi river.

Yoshino River Rafting Festival middle of August
This raft racing festival has origins from when lumber traders shipped hinoki (cypress) wood from Shiraga Mountain in rafts down the river.  Participants can race in either traditional style raft racing or the free style division.  The traditional style race involves teams with 6 participants racing on rafts made of wooden logs over 5m in length.  The free style class involves participating teams bringing their own self made rafts.  These teams compete over not just the visual attractiveness of the raft but also the `style` in which they raft down the river.

Town Festival middle of August
The annual town festival features a traditional Taiko performance, Bon odori (Japanese folk dance), and fireworks.  There is also a parade leading up to the festival where Yosakoi style dancing can be seen.

Athletic Festival early October
This 50-year-old festival features teams from various businesses and professions participating in athletic competitions.  Hundreds of locals participate in various athletic games in hopes of promoting the benefits of team work and healthy competition.

Autumn Culture Festival  middle of November
Held during the time of harvest in Motoyama.  There are also shops set up from Motoyama's sister town, Urausu.  The local community center hosts stage performances and also exhibits local art.  At the closing of the festival, a Mochi scattering ceremony is held where hundreds of people fill the assembly grounds.

Tourist sites 

In spring time the park is full of cherry blossoms and shakunage flowers (rhododendron), a sight that is famous within Kochi prefecture.  In fact, the park is also called Shakunage Park.  At the entrance is a statue of Kenzan Nonaka (野中 兼山), a local politician during the Edo period.

At 1470 m Shiraga is Motoyama's most prominent mountain.  When ascending the mountain, one can see hinoki (cypress) trees from 150 to 200 years old by the road side.
There are two approach sites where mountaineers can begin their ascent, which should take no more than 90 minutes.

A location with thousands of years of history with beautiful flowers in the spring but is also a great place to go camping in the summer.

Deep inside the mountains one can see a waterfall that sews its way through the greenery and foliage.

Local products 
Organic rice
Shiitake mushrooms
Reihoku beef
Shiso (Perilla frutescens var. crispa) juice
Yuzu orange juice
Yuzu orange vinegar
Miso
Green tea and senna tea

References

External links

Official website 
 Motoyama Board of Education website

Towns in Kōchi Prefecture